TV Pixie was a British website about television programmes founded in 2009. The company was closed in 2012.

History
TV Pixie was founded by Alex Guest after he left Zattoo, where he was the UK country manager, in 2009. The site was conceived as an ad-funded portal for television viewers to discover new TV programmes and to read reviews.

In November 2011, TV Pixie's blog was ranked 140th out of 4,935 television-related sites globally by Technorati, putting TV Pixie's blog ahead of The Guardian newspaper's TV and radio blog, ranked 210th.

Awards
The company was one of the winners of the IC Tomorrow competition run by the UK Government's Technology Strategy Board in 2011.

TV Pixie's entry is a finalist in the Technology Strategy Board's 2012 Race For Apps contest.

References 

Online companies of the United Kingdom
Review websites
Defunct companies based in London
Internet properties established in 2009